Nicki Gillis is a female vocalist and entertainer from Australia. Nicki was born in Western Australia. She spent her early years working on her family's farm just outside of Perth while attending school. Her parents worked nights in various entertainment venues around Western Australia.

Background 
At the age of 15, Nicki had her first professional engagement as a backing vocalist for Jackie Love's Western Australia tour. At 17 Nicki joined her first band, Perth's "The Power Station", a seven piece rock cover band that later became a five piece "Cold Chisel" cover band called "East".

Nicki played in numerous Perth based bands and toured nationally with Buckshot Dolly, a six piece Country Rock band, that she formed with her mother Lucy D'Olimpio in 1992. In 1996 she won the Gympie Muster Talent Quest, Australia's premier country music talent competition .

In 1997, Nicki recorded her first self-penned collection of songs – this EP, "Nicki", was then released to radio in Australia.

After 18 months living in Brisbane, Nicki returned to Western Australia to spend time writing and recording. In 2002 she headlined the World Women's Hockey Championships and performed via satellite to viewers in 16 countries.

In 2004, Nicki moved to Sydney to progress a career as a solo entertainer and initially joined with Newcastle-based, Brooke Leale, in an acoustic duet called "Velvet Moon". This was a project that lasted two years before Nicki and Brooke went on their own personal music ventures.
 
In 2005, Nicki released her first recording – "Nicki" EP  – a subdued introspective blend of songs bordering on acoustic folk rock rather than Nicki's trademark country infused rock of recent years.  This was followed by a second EP, "On The Mountain" and a limited edition album titled "To Here/Hear". She later combined these three releases into one album calling it "On The Mountain – Special Edition".

Nicki's album "Lucy's Daughter" was released in Australia in 2007 to great applause and received glowing reviews from all areas. Re-released in the UK in 2010 the album included a bonus track, "On The Mountain" and was broadly accepted as a quality release, with much praise from reviewers in some of the UK's leading genre specific music magazines.

Nicki's third recording, a joint effort with Bob Howe, called "Collaboration" was a collection of cover versions of classic rock songs that had inspired her and Bob throughout their careers. Including songs originally performed by T-Rex, REM and Snow Patrol. The album maintained a country infused feel and also received positive acclaim across the industry.

In 2011, Nicki's fourth album was released in response to requests from audiences across the world. Consisting of cover versions of songs from 1965 – 1975 that were made famous by strong women with a message. This album, "Woman of Substance" has provided Nicki's fans with a valuable insight into the songs and women that inspired Nicki from a very young age.

Nicki has toured the UK, US, South Pacific, Middle East, Germany and South East Asia. This considerable international experience has allowed her to develop a stage show that takes audiences on a journey from nostalgic and classic hits through to contemporary rock and self-penned hits.

Nicki toured the UK in 2009, 2010, 2011 and 2012 with a band that has consisted of players such as Bob Howe on guitar, Lee Goodwin on Guitar, Cozy Dixon on drums, Dave Clemo on bass who was replaced in 2012 due to illness by Lee Jackson. Her Australian band consists of Mitch Hutchinson on guitar, Dave Roberts on drums, Justin Bianchi on bass and Bryen Willems on acoustic guitar.

Nicki's music and performances engage audiences from many different demographics and musical genres. She donates significant time to charity work and is a strong supporter of returned Australian and UK service men and women. She has also been overseas to perform for Australian, US, British and NATO troops in Iraq, East Timor and the Solomon Islands. In 2010 she was granted honorary membership of the Blue Mountains Vietnam Veterans and Associated Forces Association. In 2011 she was made a member of the Australian Forces Entertainment Association and won the Australian Entertainment Industry's highest award for a country performer.

In 2011 Nicki set up her own production company, LockHouse Productions, with business partner Tracy Dann. The company assisted unsigned Australian and New Zealand artists develop a presence in the entertainment industry. Capitalizing on her own experience, the company quickly signed some of the biggest names in the independent country music field in Australia and was responsible for the record breaking 10 weeks at #1 in the UK charts for Nashville's Branch and Dean's release of "Your Ol' Lady's Gone".

In 2012 and 2013 Nicki continued to develop her international standing through further tours across Australia and the UK and into Germany for the first time where her own style of Sophisticated Country Rock Music was very well accepted. 2013 was also the year she went heavily into theater production by co-producing the stage show, "When Aussies Ruled Britannia" – a new style of theater/concert that was coined "Oral History Theater". In this show '60s superstars Frank Ifield and Keith Potger (from The Seekers) tell their stories to a background of their hits sung by Nicki and Wayne Horsburgh.

In 2014 Nicki withdrew from consistent live performances to concentrate on building a music school, focusing on voice and performance, in Sydney's outer western suburbs. During this period she mentored and developed young performers, many of whom have gone on to write and record their own material and others who have performed in high-profile entertainment events in Sydney.  During this year she also co-produced and co-starred in "Frank Ifield Remembers", a two-hour stage show where Frank tells his life story to a background of songs and music from the era.

2015 saw Nicki develop her school whilst still writing and recording new material. She also took to community events within the Nepean Valley region and assisted with charity events and fundraising. This was the year she developed another stage show called "Ladies Rock", a two-hour theater concert celebrating the contribution of women to the history for popular music.

In 2016 Nicki continued nurturing local talent under the umbrella of her music school. She was also asked to join the sales and marketing team at VintageFM in outer Sydney. She continued writing and recording despite numerous personal and health setbacks.

In 2016 she also starred alongside 60s pop legend, Frank Ifield, in her own television program, "Australian Country Showcase". Australian Country Showcase is broadcast across Europe and the United Kingdom on Keep It Country TV on Sky, Freesat and Freeview. The show is produced by Lockhouse Productions with Tracy Dann is the producer and director of the show.

In 2017, Nicki released new original material. Her first release through Hotdisc, 'Rush' Released to UK and European radio, climbed steadily until reaching number 1 on the charts. Nicki also toured the UK with her new stage show, "Tapestry The Concert" - a celebration of the songs of Carole King performed live with band. In 2017, Nicki also took on the role of General Manager at VintageFM.

Awards 
2011 Best Country Performer or Band – Australian Entertainment ("Mo") Awards
2010 People's Choice Award – Australian Capital Territory Music Festival
2009 Frank Ifield International Spur Award
2008 Australian Golden Saddle Award for Best Entertainer
2007 Horsham Female Artist of the Year
2006 Blue Mountains Best Blues Jazz Album
Before 2006 – numerous awards include prestigious Young Talent Time Scholarship at the age of 12.

Top Ten Hits – (original compositions) 
Leavin’ You For Myself
Remember Me
Honey I Don't Have Time
On the Mountain
Watch the Wildflowers Grow
Be a Star
I'll Go My Own Way
In The Daylight

Top Ten Hits – (cover songs) 
Chasing Cars (with Bob Howe)
It Doesn't Matter Anymore
I Remember You (with Frank Ifield)
The Ballad of Lucy Jordan

International Tours 
2006 – Iraq, Kuwait, Qatar, UAE
2008 – Solomon Island, East Timor, United States, Germany
2009 – United Kingdom
2010 – United Kingdom
2011 – New Zealand, USA, United Kingdom
2012 – United Kingdom
2013 – New Zealand, United Kingdom (twice), Germany
2014 – United Kingdom
2015 – United Kingdom
2017 – United Kingdom

Discography
1997 – Nicki (EP)
2002 – Bed of Roses (EP)
2004 – On The Mountain (EP)
2005 – To Here/Hear (Album)
2006 – On The Mountain – Special Edition (Album)
2007 – Lucy's Daughter (Album)
2009 – Collaboration (with Bob Howe) (Album)
2009 – Lucy's Daughter (European Edition) (Album)
2010 – I Remember You (with Frank Ifield) (Single)
2011 – Woman of Substance (Album)
2011 – Always on My Mind (EP)
2012 – Live in Hillbilly Heaven (Album)
2017 – In The Daylight (Single)
2017 – Essence (Album)

References

External links 
  www.nickigillis.com
  www.frankifield.com

1970 births
Living people
Australian country singers
21st-century Australian singers
21st-century Australian women singers